Scordia is a comune (municipality) in the Metropolitan City of Catania in the Italian region Sicily, located about  southeast of Palermo and about  southwest of Catania.  

Scordia borders the following municipalities: Lentini, Militello in Val di Catania.

References

External links
 Official website

Cities and towns in Sicily